Anderson Hernandez (born September 2, 1989), professionally known as Vinylz, is an American record producer from Washington Heights, New York City. He is currently known for his work with many artists that include Jay-Z, Desiigner, Rick Ross, Drake, J. Cole, Nicki Minaj, Jeremih and Tinashe.

Vinylz secured a publishing deal with Sony ATV through fellow record producer and mentor, Boi-1da, with whom he has also worked closely since.

Early life and career
Anderson Hernandez was born to immigrated parents from the Dominican Republic on September 2, 1989, in Washington Heights, a neighborhood located in the New York City borough of Manhattan, living across the street from adult contemporary musician Alicia Keys. Hernandez started producing at age 14. He received his stage name, Vinylz, courtesy of a friend who noticed both of his interests for clever sampling and his father's collection of vinyl records. Vinylz began taking music production seriously and it remained his favorite hobby ever since, but he went against his parents' wishes. He got an early professional start working with Swizz Beatz and decided to drop out of college after the first semester of his first year.

Setting up shop in Quad Studios, the well-known recording studio located in New York City's Time Square, Vinylz flourished through his work with up-and-coming or breakout artists like Drag-On and Cassidy. After reaching out to Canadian rapper Drake's in-house producer, Boi-1da, via Myspace to retrieve the instrumental for "Best I Ever Had", Vinylz ended up forming a relationship which would remain long after the request. Impressed by his work, Boi-1da became a mentor to the up-and-comer; the two continued on to collaborate from that point on.

In 2013, Jay Z's "F***WithMeYouKnowIGotIt" featuring Rick Ross and DJ Khaled's "No New Friends" featuring Drake, Rick Ross and Lil Wayne, both of which produced by Vinylz and Boi-1da, were respectively placed on the Top 40 of the Billboard Hot 100 chart; the latter was certified gold by the Recording Industry Association of America (RIAA). A variety of hits, alongside Boi-1da, helped Vinylz reach a publishing deal with Sony ATV.

Throughout 2015, he produced a high number of tracks for such artists, including Jeremih's "Planez", Big Sean's "Blessings", Meek Mill's "RICO", Lil Durk's "Like Me" and Chris Brown's "Back to Sleep".

Production discography
List of songs as producer or co-producer, with performing artists and other credited producers, showing year released and album name.

References

External links
 

1989 births
American hip hop record producers
Musicians from New York City
People from Washington Heights, Manhattan
Living people
East Coast hip hop musicians
American people of Dominican Republic descent
Record producers from New York (state)
FL Studio users